Prdelačka is a traditional Czech pork blood soup made during the pig slaughter season. It is prepared with pork blood pudding, potato, onion and garlic as primary ingredients. It is traditionally made as a part of pig slaughter.

See also
 List of soups

References 

Czech cuisine
Blood soups
Pork dishes